"Hold Me" is a song by Latin American boy band Menudo. It was released on 1985, as the lead single from their self-titled studio album (1985). It was the band's only ever song to chart on the American Billboard Hot 100, where it peaked at number 62.

A music video was also shot for the song, filmed around various areas of Los Angeles.

Reception and legacy
Suzette Fernandez from Billboard gave the song a positive review, saying "The English-language song featured a new generation of members and a sparkling synth-pop sound, to go with an impossibly infectious chorus, which made it a seamless fit in mid-'80s American pop."

Also Jason Lipshutz from Billboard has said: "A joyous declaration of love: Menudo is shown leaping and twirling around in the "Hold Me" music video, and this song has made listeners want to do the same for decades."

In 2018, Billboard ranked the song 53rd on its list of the "100 Greatest Boy Band Songs of All Time". In 2020, Rolling Stone ranked the song number 40 on its list of the "75 Greatest Boy Band Songs of All Time".

Charts

References 

1985 singles
1985 songs
Menudo (band) songs